Cynopoecilus is a genus of killifish in the family Rivulidae. They are endemic to seasonal temporary pools in Southern Brazil and northeastern Uruguay. Most species are restricted to the region bordering the Patos–Mirim lagoons, but C. feltrini is found at the Tubarão River (north of the lagoons) and C. intimus is found at the middle Gravataí River (inland from the lagoons). The Cynopoecilus species have small ranges and are often threatened. The region inhabited by C. intimus has experienced extensive habitat destruction and recent surveys have not been able to locate this species; it may already be extinct.

Uniquely among killifish, Cynopoecilus and the closely related Campellolebias have internal fertilization.

Species
There are currently 6 recognized species in this genus:

 Cynopoecilus feltrini W. J. E. M. Costa, Amorim & Mattos, 2016
 Cynopoecilus fulgens W. J. E. M. Costa, 2002
 Cynopoecilus intimus W. J. E. M. Costa, 2002
 Cynopoecilus melanotaenia (Regan, 1912)
 Cynopoecilus nigrovittatus W. J. E. M. Costa, 2002
 Cynopoecilus notabilis Ferrer, Wingert & L. R. Malabarba, 2014

References

Rivulidae
Freshwater fish genera
Taxa named by Charles Tate Regan